Zhazira or Jazira is a Kazakh feminine given name. Notable people with the name include:

Zhazira Nurimbetova (born 1991), Kazakh beauty pageant titleholder
Zhazira Zhapparkul (born 1993), Kazakhstani weightlifter

Kazakh given names
Feminine given names